Riccardo Stacchiotti (born 8 November 1991) is an Italian former professional racing cyclist. He rode in the Giro d'Italia in 2015 and 2016.

Major results

2013
 8th Gran Premio della Liberazione
2014
 1st  Mountains classification Tour of Estonia
 10th GP Izola
2015
 1st  Overall Tour de Hokkaido
1st Stages 1 & 3
 5th Overall Tour of China II
 9th Overall Tour of China I
2016
 2nd Overall Tour of China II
2018
 Tour of Bihor
1st  Points classification
1st Stage 3
 Volta a Portugal
1st Stages 1 & 5
 1st Stage 4 GP Nacional 2 de Portugal
2019
 Sibiu Cycling Tour
1st  Points classification
1st Stage 4
 1st  Points classification Ronde de l'Oise
 1st Stage 1 Giro di Sicilia
 4th Trofej Umag
 8th Poreč Trophy
 9th Coppa Bernocchi

Grand Tour general classification results timeline

References

External links

 

1991 births
Living people
Italian male cyclists
People from Recanati
Sportspeople from the Province of Macerata
Cyclists from Marche